Wurundjeri Way is a  road running through the Docklands Development west of the Melbourne central business district. It was constructed in 1999 as part of replanning and development of the former Melbourne rail yards and docks. Wurundjeri Way runs from Montague Street, South Melbourne to Dudley Street, West Melbourne via the Charles Grimes Bridge.

When the Melbourne Docklands were redeveloped in the 1990s, Footscray Road was closed as a through route and rebuilt as Harbour Esplanade. To replace the through route, Wurundjeri Way was constructed to the east. To connect to this new road Flinders Street was upgraded, and the north end of the Charles Grimes Bridge was rebuilt on a curve to connect to it. Reconstruction started in June 1999, and was completed by 2001.

A feature of the road, and integral to its design and naming, is the gigantic statue of Bunjil the eagle, by Melbourne sculptor Bruce Armstrong which was constructed in the median at the south end of the road. Proposals to develop this area for new buildings including the air rights over Wurundjeri Way, may require the statue to be moved.

Major intersections

|}

References

External links

Streets in Melbourne
Transport in the City of Melbourne (LGA)